Battle of Pszczyna (Polish: Bitwa Pszczyńska) refers to a series of battles between 1 and 2 September 1939 near the town of Pszczyna during the Invasion of Poland. The battle of Pszczyna formed part of the defensive Battle of the Border. The initial, decisive victory of the Polish forces on September 1, 1939 was followed by the crushing defeat on the next day near Ćwiklice, due to a major tactical error on the part of the Polish military command, resulting in premature withdrawal of the entire Armia Kraków from Upper Silesia.

Background 
The Rybnicki and Kobiorski forests constituted the north-side perimeter of the battlefield, and to the south, the Vistula river along with the right tributary of Odra, the Piotrówka river provided natural protection. The defensive line some 22 kilometers in length was built by Poland already in 192933, as part of the strategic plan for securing the national border around the Central Industrial Region. The fortifications erected at the cost of zl 300,000, included concrete shelters manned by the Silesian 23rd Infantry Division. In 193637 two new bridges were built over the Vistula and the Chochułka rivers near Goczałkowice and Pszczyna for military transport, and the supply roads were paved with asphalt in late 1930s. Overall, the defense line seemed sufficient at the time to stop a successful panzer attack. The tactical mistake of the Polish command was the assumption that the attack of the German 5th Panzer Division would require the support of infantry to secure its rear.

Overview 

The battle can be divided into four phases:
 1 September: successful Polish defense of the outer positions near the Brzeźce and Wisła Wielka villages.
 2 September, morning: Polish defense of the main positions near Pszczyna.
 2 September, afternoon: battles near Ćwiklice.
 3 September - 4 September: Polish successful separation and withdrawal, however they paid dearly (Polish withdrawal was successful mainly thanks to a diversionary counterattack on Ćwiklice made by two battalions from the 16th infantry regiment which gave time for other units to regroup and withdraw).

During the second day of the battle Polish forces suffered a defeat and were forced to retreat. The main reason of their defeat (apart from huge German material and numerical superiority) was that the Polish commanders incorrectly predicted the direction of the main German attack on 2 September. As the result, the whole Polish plan of defense failed, because then it became impossible to activate a huge trap, which was prepared for German tanks, called the "big bag" trap, which was weak in front, but strong on its sides - with strong artillery assisting in attacking targets which entered the 'bag'. Also, overmuch certainty after great successes of the previous day (especially fierce, few hours-long combat - with use of the "big bag" trap - near Brzeźce village) contributed to Polish defeat.

Because of their certainty, Polish commanders decided to make "the big bag trap" more shallow - which meant that it was less flexible, and Polish positions would be easier to crush if the defense was not successful (as it happened) - but on the other hand - if the defense was successful (which didn't happen since the unexpected direction and strength of the German main attack were deadly), the shallow "bag" would be more effective because the German attack would be stopped faster and with greater casualties for the enemy due to a greater concentration of firepower.

The defeat suffered at Pszczyna (which also caused a loss of a significant percent of divisional artillery) forced the Polish High Command to pull back the entire frontline, and cede the territory of Upper Silesia to the Germans.

German equipment losses and Polish equipment losses and casualties (list may be incomplete)

Casualty list according to monograph about the battle titled Bitwa Pszczyńska 1939 ("Battle of Pszczyna 1939") by Janusz Ryt.

After the long and bloody combat at Ćwiklice on 2 September 1939, German war correspondent K. Frowein wrote after seeing one of the Polish infantrymen heavily wounded:
{{Quote|This was the first Polish soldier I have ever seen. Bloody piece of human suffering. Legs pulled up to his chest because of pain, face – greenish-pale. From his thin lips almost inaudible scream was getting out – "Water! Water!". We unbuttoned his uniform jacket – smeared with blood and entrails. German orderly gave him canteen with water. For the last time a smile appeared on his face, when he whispered: "Danke". A few minutes later he died. Now he rests in peace where he fell, under a straight, wooden cross, decorated with Polish helmet and a plate with inscription: "Six Polish soldiers".This Polish infantryman died like a real soldier.  Until the end he was defending his post, completing his orders.  When deadly bullets reached him, his munition holds were empty, and in the magazine of his rifle there were only 2 bullets. — War correspondent K. Frowein, 2 IX 1939. }}

 See also 

 List of World War II military equipment of Poland
 List of German military equipment of World War II

 Notes 

 References 
 Janusz Ryt, Bitwa pszczyńska 1939 (Battle of Pszczyna 1939), Infopres, Pszczyna: Starostwo Powiatowe, 2007. Volume 2 of Biblioteczka Ziemi Pszczyńskiej'', .  Book excerpts with Commentary from Histmag.org 7 August 2008. Retrieved December 18, 2014.

Battles of the Invasion of Poland
Silesian Voivodeship (1920–1939)
September 1939 events
Pszczyna